Aleksandr Anatolyevich Proshkin (born 25 March 1940) is a Russian film director and screenwriter. He has directed fourteen films since 1975. His 2009 film The Miracle was entered into the 31st Moscow International Film Festival.

Selected filmography
 Cold Summer of 1953 (Холодное лето пятьдесят третьего, 1987)
 Nikolai Vavilov (Николай Вавилов, 1990)
 The Black Veil (Чёрная вуаль, 1995)
 The Captain's Daughter (Русский бунт, 2000)
 Live and Remember (Живи и помни, 2008)
 The Miracle (Чудо, 2009)
 Dr. Zhivago (2006 film) Доктор Живаго https://www.lavanguardia.com/peliculas-series/peliculas/movie-352368

References

External links

1940 births
Living people
Russian film directors
Soviet film directors
20th-century Russian screenwriters
20th-century Russian male writers
Male screenwriters
Russian male writers
Soviet screenwriters
Mass media people from Saint Petersburg
Academicians of the National Academy of Motion Picture Arts and Sciences of Russia